"My Ex's Best Friend" (stylized in all lowercase) is a song by American musician Machine Gun Kelly featuring fellow American musician Blackbear. It is the third single off of the former's pop-punk fifth studio album Tickets to My Downfall. The song reached number 20 on the US Billboard Hot 100 chart, becoming the third top-40 hit for both artists.

Background and release
Colson Baker, better known as Machine Gun Kelly, released his fourth studio album, Hotel Diablo, on July 5, 2019, via EST 19XX, Bad Boy, and Interscope Records. The third single from that album, "I Think I'm Okay", was a collaboration with Yungblud and Travis Barker, which served as a segue for Baker's transition towards rock music. Baker described the song as "our first 'Oh shit. I think we might be onto something' moment". Baker booked a studio session with Barker, recording what would become the song "Bloody Valentine". Machine Gun Kelly describes the session as "so powerful that Travis was like, 'Fuck it, I'm blocking off two months of my life and we're doing this album'". On December 4, 2019, Machine Gun Kelly tweeted, "rock album in 2020".

Baker first collaborated with Blackbear on "End of the Road", the final track on Baker's 2012 debut album Lace Up. Both artists made a guest appearance on "Shoot'Em Down", from Mod Sun's 2015 album Look Up. In 2017, Machine Gun Kelly appeared as a featured vocalist on Blackbear's track "E.Z.", from his album Cybersex. Baker teased another collaboration with Blackbear in December 2019, posting a screenshot of their text conversation on his Instagram account, with the caption, "ayy the @bear vocals came in". "My Ex's Best Friend" was officially released on August 7, 2020.

Composition and themes
The song was described as pop punk, but as a modern take on it, rather than the "classic" form of the genre. Publications described it as a "guitar-laden" song with the two singers covering the complications of relationship breakups and rebound relationships. The song's "infectious guitar line" has been noted as being one of the most memorable moments on the Tickets to My Downfall album.

Reception
HotNewHipHop praised the song, but noted that the enjoyment the listener gets would vary based on their attitude on the music's new sound, stating "If you're not on board for MGK's departure from hip-hop... you'll likely hit skip within the opening moments of [the song]. For those who decide to stay, you'll be treated to a tale of forbidden passion, the likes of which have fueled pop-punk balladry for years." 

In an otherwise negative review of Tickets to My Downfall, Sputnikmusic contended that while the he felt it is not a good song by any means, it makes an effort to experiment and amalgamate pop-punk riffs with his familiar rap sensibilities.

Accolades

Live performances
On August 30, 2020, Machine Gun Kelly and Blackbear performed "My Ex's Best Friend" live at the 2020 MTV Video Music Awards. 

Machine Gun Kelly also performed this song on the September 25th episode of The Kelly Clarkson Show, a day after he made an appearance on the show the day before. MGK performed it during the 2020 American Music Awards on November 22, and on New Year’s Eve during  Dick Clark's New Year's Rockin' Eve 2021 with Ryan Seacrest. Coincidentally, both events were produced by Dick Clark Productions and aired on ABC. 

He also performed the song on the January 30th episode of NBC’s Saturday Night Live, which was hosted by John Krasinski.

Personnel
Credits adapted from Tidal.

 Machine Gun Kelly – vocals, guitar
 Blackbear – vocals
 Travis Barker – production
 BazeXX – additional production
 SlimXX – additional production
 Omer Fedi – bass guitar, guitar
 Nick Long – guitar
 Colin Leonard – master engineering
 John Hanes – mix engineering
 Serban Ghenea – mixing

Charts

Weekly charts

Year-end charts

Certifications

Release history

References

2020 songs
2020 singles
Machine Gun Kelly (musician) songs
American pop punk songs
Bad Boy Records singles
Blackbear (musician) songs
Interscope Records singles
Song recordings produced by Travis Barker
Songs written by Blackbear (musician)
Songs written by Machine Gun Kelly (musician)
Songs written by Travis Barker